James McManus (born 1951) is an American writer and poker player.

James or Jim McManus may also refer to:
 James McManus (rugby league) (born 1986), Scottish rugby player
 James Edward McManus (1900–1976), American prelate of the Roman Catholic Church
 James Hilton McManus (born 1992), badminton player from South Africa
 James McManus (Royal Australian Navy) (1891–1972)
 James O. McManus (born 1894), lieutenant governor of Rhode Island
 James McManus (Iowa politician) (1804–1879), member of the Iowa House of Representatives
 Jim McManus (baseball) (born 1936), American baseball player
 Jim McManus (actor) (born 1940), British actor
 Jim McManus (tennis) (1940–2011), American tennis player
 Jim McKay (1921–2008), American sportscaster born James McManus